James W. VanStone (October 3, 1925 – February 28, 2001) was an American cultural anthropologist specializing in the group of peoples then known as Eskimos (now Inuit, Iñupiat, and Yup'ik). He studied at the University of Pennsylvania and was a student of Frank Speck and Alfred Irving Hallowell. One of his first positions was at the Field Museum of Natural History in Chicago. In 1951, following completion of graduate studies, he joined the faculty of the Department of Anthropology at the University of Alaska in Fairbanks. In 1955 and 1956, he conducted fieldwork with the Inuit at Point Hope, Alaska. Beginning in the summer of 1960, he started field work among Chipewyan Indians (First Nations), living along the east shore of Great Slave Lake in Canada's Northwest Territories among eastern Athapaskans for a period of eleven months over three years. He died of heart failure.

Published works
 Darnell, Regna (2006) "Keeping the Faith: A Legacy of Native American Ethnography, Ethnohistory, and Psychology." In: New Perspectives on Native North America: Cultures, Histories, and Representations, ed. by Sergei A. Kan and Pauline Turner Strong, pp. 3–16. Lincoln: University of Nebraska Press.

Many of the following are available on-line from Archive.org:

The ethnoarcheology of Crow Village, Alaska, by Wendell H. Oswalt and James W. VanStone. Washington, U.S. Govt. Print. Off., 1967.
Eskimos of the Nushagak River; an ethnographic history, by James W. VanStone. Seattle, University of Washington Press [1967]
Preliminary report of archaeological field work in southwest Alaska, 1966. [S.l. : s.n., 1966?]
The changing culture of the Snowdrift Chipewyan, by James W. VanStone. Ottawa [Queen's Printer] 1965.
The Snowdrift Chipewyan. Ottawa, Canada : Northern Coordination and Research Centre, Dept. of Northern Affairs and National Resources, 1963.
An archaeological collection from Somerset Island and Boothia Peninsula, N.W.T. [by] James W. VanStone. A contribution to the human osteology of the Canadian Arctic [by] J. E. Anderson and C. F. Merbs. [Toronto, 1962]
Point Hope : an Eskimo village in transition / by James W. Vanstone. Seattle, Wash. : University of Washington Press, 1962.
The economy of a frontier community : a preliminary statement / by James W. VanStone. Ottawa, Canada : Dept. of Northern Affairs and National Resources, Northern Co-ordination and Research Centre, 1961.
VanStone, James W. Point Hope: An Eskimo Village in Transition. Seattle: University of Washington Press. 1962
Point Hope : an Eskimo community in northwest Alaska / James W. VanStone. [Fairbanks] : Alaskan Air Command, Arctic Aeromedical Laboratory, 1961.
The Caribou Eskimos of Eskimo Point / J.W. Vanstone, W. Oswalt. [Ottawa, Canada?] : Northern Co-ordination and research Centre, Dept. of Northern Affairs and National Resources [1959?]
Athapaskan adaptations : hunters and fishermen of the subarctic forests / James W. VanStone. Arlington Heights, Ill. : AHM, c1974.
Cultures of the Bering Sea region : papers from an international symposium / edited by Henry N. Michael and James W. VanStone. New York, N.Y. (655 Third Ave., New York 10017) : IREX, International Research & Exchanges Board,
Archaeological excavations at Kotzebue, Alaska / James W. VanStone. [1954]

Monographs published by the Field Museum
VanStone wrote, edited, and contributed to several monographs published by the Field Museum in the Fieldiana: Anthropology series:

References

1925 births
2001 deaths
People associated with the Field Museum of Natural History
University of Pennsylvania alumni
Place of birth missing
20th-century American anthropologists
Eskimologists